Saint-Jean-Kerdaniel is a commune in the Côtes-d'Armor département of Brittany in northwestern France.

Population

Inhabitants of Saint-Jean-Kerdaniel are called kerdanielais in French.

See also
Communes of the Côtes-d'Armor department

References

External links

Communes of Côtes-d'Armor